Wattstown Platform railway station was a short-lived railway station on the now-disused Maerdy Branch in South Wales.

History and description
The Wattstown goods depot opened in 1885, but a passenger facility did not follow until 1905. The station was not successful, and closed after just fifteen years. Goods activities continued until 7 October 1963. No trace of the station remains, with the trackbed having been reclaimed by nature. Only a road bridge marks the site where the platform once stood.

The  site of the goods depot (ST019937) is now occupied by a builder's merchant.

References

Disused railway stations in Rhondda Cynon Taf
Former Taff Vale Railway stations
Railway stations in Great Britain opened in 1905
Railway stations in Great Britain closed in 1920